Carlos Antonio Mendoza Soto (31 October 1856, in Panama City – 13 February 1916) was Panamanian politician who served since 1908 as the second presidential designate in the government of José Domingo de Obaldía and since the death of the first presidential designate José Agustín Arango in 1909 he was first in line to the presidency. In that capacity Mendoza became President of Panama from 1 March 1910 to 1 October 1910. He belonged to the Liberal Party.

He was elected as the third presidential designate by the National Assembly for the term 1904–1906.

References
• Mellander, Gustavo A., Mellander, Nelly, Charles Edward Magoon: The Panama Years. Río Piedras, Puerto Rico: Editorial Plaza Mayor. ISBN 1-56328-155-4. OCLC 42970390. (1999)

• Mellander, Gustavo A., The United States in Panamanian Politics: The Intriguing Formative Years." Danville, Ill.: Interstate Publishers. OCLC 138568. (1971)

1856 births
1916 deaths
People from Panama City
Panamanian people of Spanish descent
National Liberal Party (Panama) politicians
Presidents of Panama
Vice presidents of Panama